Alcohol as Fuel may refer to:

 Ethanol fuel
 Alcohol and weight, calculating caloric density of ethyl alcohol
 Alcohol as Fuel (TV series), a 10-part how-to series written and hosted by David Blume